The Montreal Tapes: with Paul Bley and Paul Motian is a live album by the American jazz bassist Charlie Haden with pianist Paul Bley and drummer Paul Motian recorded in 1989 and released on the Verve label.

Reception 
The Allmusic review by Scott Yanow awarded the album 3 stars, stating, "The musical communication between the three masterful players is impressive on this generally introspective set".

Track listing
All compositions by Charlie Haden except as indicated
 "Turnaround/When Will the Blues Leave?" (Ornette Coleman) - 13:17 
 "New Beginning" - 8:47 
 "Cross Road" (Coleman) - 6:40 
 "So Far, So Good" (Paul Bley) - 7:27 
 "Ida Lupino" (Carla Bley) - 11:19 
 "Latin Genetics" (Coleman) - 4:35 
 "Body Beautiful" (Paul Motian) - 8:03 
 "Turnaround" (Coleman) - 7:51 
Recorded at the Montreal International Jazz Festival on July 7, 1989

Personnel 
 Charlie Haden – bass
 Paul Bley - piano
 Paul Motian - drums

References 

Verve Records live albums
Charlie Haden live albums
1994 live albums